Diplomatic illness is the practice amongst diplomats and government ministers of feigning illness, or another debilitating condition, to avoid engaging in diplomatic or social engagements. The excuse of ill-health is designed to avoid formally offending the host or other parties. The term also refers to the period during which the "diplomatic illness" is claimed to persist.

Examples
 General John J. Pershing, on his return in 1926 from unsuccessful negotiations between Peru, Bolivia and Chile and suffering from ill-health, was stated by his critics to have a "diplomatic illness".
 During the Communist takeover in Czechoslovakia in 1948, foreign minister Jan Masaryk was thought to have a "diplomatic illness", as he stayed out of touch with many of his former foreign contacts.
 American political activist Lyndon LaRouche writes in his autobiography "The Power of Reason" that in 1975 the Iraqi ambassador to Paris, after a meeting, telephoned to advise him to contract a "diplomatic illness" rather than attend a seminar as had been arranged. The ambassador explained that LaRouche appeared to be under surveillance.
 A temporary absence of Bosnian Serb leader Ratko Mladic, at a time in 1995 when Bosnian Serb forces were withdrawing  near Sarajevo under an agreement with NATO, was ascribed by some sources to "diplomatic illness".
 Boris Yeltsin, the then leader of the Russian Federation, was sometimes claimed to be invoking "diplomatic illness". One occasion was in 1994 on the outbreak of the First Chechen War; another coincided with a 1998 summit meeting of the Commonwealth of Independent States, and another was in 1999 when he was due to sign a treaty with Belarusian leader Alexander Lukashenko. The allegations were dubious, as Yeltsin suffered from repeated genuine bouts of ill-health.
 Polish leader Lech Kaczyński cited illness to avoid a Weimar Triangle meeting in the wake of a diplomatic dispute with Germany in 2006.
 In December 2012 Secretary of State Hillary Rodham Clinton cited a virus infection and concussion as reason not to appear before Congress in connection with the September terrorist attack on the U.S. mission in Benghazi, Libya. Clinton had been scheduled to respond to questions about whether security failures were to blame for the attack. John R. Bolton, former ambassador to the United Nations, described this as a "diplomatic illness", and Republican representative Allen West termed it as "Benghazi flu". The effects of concussion were later confirmed in hospital tests and Clinton gave her testimony the following month.

Related terms
William Gladstone referred to a "diplomatic cold" as an alternative to declining a social engagement outright.
Neville Chamberlain is reported to have contracted "diplomatic gout" in 1938.
Polite fiction

Footnotes

Diplomacy
Human diseases and disorders